Jiang Yanjing (born January 19, 1959, in Shenyang, China) is a Chinese acrobat who specializes in High Unicycle Bowl-Kicking and was a former member of the Shenyang Acrobatics Troupe.

Having won a gold medal at the International Festival of Circus Arts in France, it is believed that he created the current style of kicking the bowls (Facing opposite directions). He is also credited with creating the incredible teapot finale to the act, which few others have been able to imitate due to its difficulty. He moved to the United States in 1999 and currently resides in Pasadena, California.

References 

Acrobats
Living people
People from Shenyang
Year of birth missing (living people)